Hanna Abboud (Arabic : حنا عبود) is an author, critic, translator, and mythographer, born in the village of Qalatiyya in the city of Tal Kalakh in the Homs governorate in 1937. He was educated in Homs, graduated from Damascus University with a BA in Arabic Language and Literature, and worked as a teacher, in addition to his work in editing the magazine "Foreign Literature" and "The Literary Attitude" magazine issued by the Arab Writers Union in Damascus. He is a member of the Literary Criticism Society of the Arab Writers Union. He is considered one of the critics of poetry in the second half of the twentieth century. He has authored numerous books on criticism of philosophical and political thought, literary economics, translation of criticism and literary theory.

He has authored numerous books on criticism of philosophical and political thought, literary economics, translation of criticism and literary theory, Including: The prophetic in literature, the pillars of the novel and the divine comedy. In philosophical, social and political translations, he has published 16 books discussing fictional socialism, historical materialism and the struggle of ideas, including: A Brief History of Philosophy, the Holy Family and Social Sciences. He lectured and participated in many literary and intellectual seminars and conferences in Syria, Lebanon, Tunisia, Libya, Saudi Arabia, the Arab Emirates and Yugoslavia.

His life 
He spent his childhood in the Orthodox orphanage in Homs after the death of his parents when he was five years old, where he spent eight years in the orphanage, which had a great impact on the formation of his literary personality, his learning of music and his deepening in reading and literature. He wrote the spinning poem while in middle school and he stayed for more than three years while writing poetry. He was the first to obtain a high school diploma in his modest village.

He received his studies in Homs and graduated from Damascus University with a BA in Arabic language and worked as a teacher. And he was busy with his literary critical thought a lot. Hanna Abboud practiced the teaching profession after graduating from the university until 1989, and he considered it a patriotic duty until it removed him a little from his literary critical project. He won several awards, including the Arab Writers Union Appreciation Award in literary criticism.

His Works 
Among his most prominent books:

 The Realist School of Modern Arab Criticism – Study – Damascus 1978.
 The theater of closed circuits – study – Damascus 1978.
 The Great Displacement and its Impact on Arab Literature – Damascus 1979.
 Post-war Realism – Study – Damascus 1980.
 Adam's apple – a study in Lawrence literature – Beirut 1980.
 Wild bees and bitter honey – a study in contemporary Syrian poetry – Damascus 1982.
 Social Sciences – Translation – Damascus 1981.
 The Clash of Ideas in the Modern Era – translation – Damascus 1981.
 Brief History of Philosophy – translation – Beirut 1971.
 The Poem and the Body – Study – Damascus 1988.
 Modernity through history – a study – Damascus 1989.
 Chapters from Literary Economics – Study – Damascus 1997.

In addition to a large number of books that he translated on literary criticism, philosophy, history, and literature.

Among his books also

References 

Syrian writers
1937 births
Living people